Glenidion is a genus of flea beetles in the  family Chrysomelidae. There are 12 species, from the Neotropics.

Selected species
 Glenidion atrox
 Glenidion flexicaulis (Schaeffer, 1905)
 Glenidion herbigradum

References

Alticini
Chrysomelidae genera
Articles created by Qbugbot
Taxa named by Hamlet Clark